The Hohburg Hills, also called Hohburg Switzerland (Hohburger Schweiz), are located in the district of Nordsachsen near the eponymous village of Hohburg in the municipality of Lossatal in the German state of Saxony.

Geography 
These quartz-porphyry hills rise prominently up to 120 metres out of the surround plain of the Leipzig Bay, east of the  River Mulde. Other high points are the  Gaudlitzberg, the Burzelberg and the Galgenberg ("Gallows Hill").

In the valley lying amongst the Hohburg Hills, the stream of the Lossabach flows through Müglenz, Hohburg, Klein- and Großzschepa to empty into the Mulde near Thallwitz.

History 
The Hohburg Hills were shaped by decades of intensive stone quarrying. This produced steep rock faces and several lakes in the hollows that were left behind. The rock faces, up to forty meters high, have been used for climbing since 1925. Climbers from the area, such as Felix Simon, made use of the terrain as a training ground for the Alps. Many of the climbs used in those days fell victim to ongoing quarry operations. From 1965, the Schwarze Wand ("Black Wall") has been used for Alpine training (aid climbing). Since the mid-1990s, many, new, very difficult routes have emerged as part of a further wave of development. Currently there are over 500 climbing routes in various quarries.

References

External links 
Climbing in the Hohburg Hills at Der Bergvagabund.de

Hills of Saxony
Hill ranges of Germany
Climbing areas of Germany
Protected landscapes in Germany
Quarries in Germany